Peter Wilkinson is an Australian drummer who was a member of the rock band, The Saints.

Wilkinson joined the group in 1999, and appeared first on the 2001 album Spit the Blues Out and, later, on Nothing is Straight in My House (2005) and Imperious Delirium (2006).

Wilkinson then joined The Saints band mate, Chris Bailey on a detour with French band H-Burns, to form Bailey Burns. They recorded the album Stranger, released 2011, and proceeded to tour in France. The Saints album King of the Sun, released in 2013, was recorded in Trackdown studios, Sydney, again with Wilkinson behind the drums.

DiscographySpit the Blues Out (2001) – The SaintsNothing is Straight in My House (2005) – The SaintsImperious Delirium (2006) – The SaintsBone Box (2005) – Chris Bailey & The General DogStranger (2011) – Bailey Burns
 King of the Sun'' (2013) – The Saints

References 

Australian rock drummers
Male drummers
Living people
Australian punk rock musicians
The Saints (Australian band) members
Year of birth missing (living people)